Ranjit Dhimal (born 4 April 1991), also known as Rajin Dhimal, is a Nepali professional footballer. He made his first appearance for the Nepal national football team on 31 October 2014. He plays for TSC.

Club career
Dhimal started his career with Radhika Secondary School in Morang District. In 2009 Radhika won the Coca-Cola Cup Inter-school National Football Tournament with Dhimal scoring in the penalty shootout win over Janak Memorial Boarding School also of Morang. As the victors Radhika were awarded the 200,000 rupees cash prize.

In 2009/10 Dhimal played for Three Star Club

In 2011 Dhimal joined APF

In 2013 Dhimal Joined NRT

In 2014 Dhimal joined Machhindra FC

In 2015 Dhimal joined Three Star Club.

Biratnagar City

Ranjit Dhimal joined Biratnagar City as their marquee player  for the inaugural season of Nepal Super League 2021. He scored 1 goals in 6 games. He also won the Super Player Of The Match against F.C. Chitwan .

International career
Dhmal had previously been selected for the Nepal national under-23 football team. Dhimal played at the 2014 Asian Games Men's Tournament as Nepal crashed out with three defeats.

In 2014, Dhimal was selected to play in a Friendly Match against the Philippines. He came on for Bimal Magar in the 72nd minute.

Tropy
Nepal
2016 AFC Solidarity Cup

References

1991 births
Living people
Nepalese footballers
Nepal international footballers
Association football midfielders
Footballers at the 2014 Asian Games
Asian Games competitors for Nepal
Three Star Club players